Kampong Chhnang Football Club (Khmer: ខេត្តកំពង់ឆ្នាំង), is a football club based in Kampong Chhnang Province, Cambodia. The club competes in the Hun Sen Cup, the major national cup competition of Cambodian football. The team represents the Province and competes annually in the Provincial Stage of the competition.

References
https://cncc-football.com/hun-sen-cup.html

External links 
Hun Sen Cup
Football clubs in Cambodia
Kampong Chhnang province